The Fair Trade Federation (FTF) is a nonprofit trade association that provides support to and promotes North American businesses that they identify as being fully committed to the principles of fair trade. In this vein, it describes itself as "part of the global fair trade movement, promoting a system that aims to pay fair wages and create long-term, direct trading relationships based on dialogue, transparency, equity and respect."

History
The FTF began through alliances formed in the late 1970s when individual alternative trade organizations began holding yearly conferences for groups working in fair trade. In 1994, the group incorporated formally as the North American Alternative Trade Organization (NAATO) and, the following year, changed its name to the Fair Trade Federation.  Since then, FTF has focused on supporting businesses aligned with its fair trade ideology in order to expand markets for artisans and farmers around the world.

FTF has been an active member of the World Fair Trade Organization (formerly IFAT) for many years.

Principles
FTF states that its members are required to commit to the following nine principles in all of their transactions:
Create opportunities for economically and socially marginalized producers
Develop transparent and accountable relationships
Build capacity
Promote fair trade
Payment of a fair price
Support safe and empowering working conditions
Ensure the rights of children
Cultivate environmental stewardship
Respect cultural identity

Membership
FTF members undergo a rigorous screening process to try to ensure adherence to the organization's principles. The Federation does not certify individual products, but instead evaluates an entire business for its commitment to Fair Trade. FTF members include retailers, wholesalers of agricultural and handmade goods, cafés, and coffee shops.

Activities
FTF runs annual conferences and offers resources to help entrepreneurs begin and strengthen their fair trade operations. It provides business owners with a forum through which to network with other fair trade businesses and raises awareness about the perceived importance of fair trade.

In Boston on September 10–12, 2010, FTF cosponsored the Fair Trade Futures Conference—the largest fair trade conference in North America.

Partners
World Fair Trade Organization (formerly known as IFAT)
Equiterre
Green America
World Fair Trade Organization - Asia
International Resources for Fairer Trade (IRFT) India
Cooperation for Fair Trade in Africa
World Fair Trade Organization - Europe
La Asociacion Latinoamericana de Comercio Justo
Fair World Project

References

External links
The Fair Trade Federation, official website
FTF's Member Directory

Fair trade organizations
Organizations established in 1994